The 1974 NCAA Division I Men's Soccer Tournament was the sixteenth organized men's college soccer tournament by the National Collegiate Athletic Association, to determine the top college soccer team in the United States. The Howard Bison won their second national title (their first title in 1971 was vacated by the NCAA) by defeating the two-time defending champion Saint Louis Billikens, 2–1, after four overtimes. The final match was played on December 7, 1974, in St. Louis, Missouri, at the Busch Memorial Stadium.

Tournament

Championship Rounds

Third-Place Final

Final

See also  
 1974 NCAA Division II Soccer Championship
 1974 NCAA Division III Soccer Championship
 1974 NAIA Soccer Championship

References 

Championship
NCAA Division I Men's Soccer Tournament seasons
NCAA
NCAA Division I Men's Soccer